Ivan Konstantinovich Korshunov (born 7 March 2002) is a Russian football player. He plays for FC Dynamo Saint Petersburg.

Club career
Pupil of the FC Zenith Academy from his native St. Petersburg. He played for FC Zenit Saint Petersburg youth and youth teams. In February 2021 he was loaned to the Russian Football National League FC Irtysh Omsk.

He made his debut in the Russian Football National League for FC Irtysh Omsk on 27 February 2021 in a game against FC Neftekhimik Nizhnekamsk.

In parallel with being under contract at FC Zenit Saint Petersburg, he played in the Media League for 2DROTS, which was not welcomed by the Zenit leadership. In the summer of 2022, he decided not to renew his contract with the St. Petersburg club and moved to FC SKA-Khabarovsk, signing an agreement under the 2+2 year scheme.

References

External links
 
 Profile by Russian Football National League
 
 

2002 births
Footballers from Saint Petersburg
Living people
Russian footballers
Russia youth international footballers
Association football midfielders
FC Zenit Saint Petersburg players
FC Irtysh Omsk players
FC Zenit-2 Saint Petersburg players
FC SKA-Khabarovsk players
FC Dynamo Saint Petersburg players
Russian First League players
Russian Second League players